Konopnica may refer to the following places:

Konopnica, Poddębice County in Łódź Voivodeship (central Poland)
Konopnica, Rawa County in Łódź Voivodeship (central Poland)
Konopnica, Lublin Voivodeship (east Poland)
Konopnica, Wieluń County in Łódź Voivodeship (central Poland)
Konopnica (Vlasotince) in southern Serbia
Konopnica, Kriva Palanka in North Macedonia